Saskia Wickham (born 14 January 1967) is an English actress best known for playing Alex Wilton in the drama series Boon and Dr. Erica Matthews in the ITV television drama series Peak Practice between 1996 and 1998.

Early and personal life
Wickham is the daughter of English actor Jeffry Wickham and Claire Stewart. From an early age, she knew that she wanted to act. Sister of Rupert Wickham, an actor.

Wickham is married to the television director Robert Bierman, and has four daughters.

Career
At the first annual Ian Charleson Awards in 1991, Wickham received a commendation for her 1990 performance as Sonya in Uncle Vanya at The Old Vic Theatre.
 
She is best known nationally for playing Dr. Erica Matthews in the ITV television drama series Peak Practice between 1996 and 1998. Other major roles include Gunvor, the love interest of the main character, in Prince of Jutland, who is tragically murdered when pregnant, Clarissa Harlowe in the BBC costume drama mini series Clarissa (1991), Alex Wilton in the ITV series Boon and Claudia Seabrook MP in the BBC drama Our Friends in the North (1996). The actress was cast as a prospective wife for one of the title characters in the one-off The Fast Show spinoff Ted & Ralph. Wickham also appeared in an episode of Midsomer Murders entitled "Last Year's Model".

Between 2001 and 2002, Wickham played a role in the BBC Radio 4 comedy The Leopard in Autumn. She also played chaplain Cordelia Denby in the Channel 4 sitcom Green Wing, and played Luke Rutherford's mother, Jenny Rutherford, in the ITV drama Demons. Wickham appeared in the Channel 4 soap Hollyoaks in March 2013 as Anna Blake.

Wickham also performed as a voice actress, narrating audiobooks such as Anna Karenina, The Two Gentlemen of Verona, and Richard III.

Filmography

References

External links
 

1967 births
Living people
English television actresses
Actresses from London
English soap opera actresses
English radio actresses
20th-century English actresses
21st-century English actresses